Reza Ghoochannejhad Nournia (born 20 September 1987) is a former professional footballer who played as a forward. He is also known as Gucci in Belgium and Netherlands. Having played for the Netherlands at youth level, he switched to the Iran national team at senior level. He scored 17 goals in 44 appearances for Iran and participated in the 2014 and 2018 FIFA World Cups and the 2015 AFC Asian Cup.

Early life
Ghoochannejhad was born in Mashhad, Iran, and emigrated to the Netherlands at the age of four.

Club career

Heerenveen
Ghoochannejhad spent twelve years in the Eredivisie side Heerenveen's academy, rising through the ranks at Leeuwarden clubs LAC Frisia 1883 and Cambuur, before making his senior Heerenveen debut against AZ Alkmaar in 2006.

In the summer of 2009, Ghoochannejhad folded his contract with Heerenveen due to his focus on his academic studies at the Vrije University of Amsterdam, studying jurisprudence and political theory. After meeting Marc Overmars, Ghoochannejhad was convinced to sign for the Go Ahead Eagles.

Cambuur
In his first game for Cambuur, on 22 January 2010 against BV Veendam, he scored his first goal after nine seconds for his new team, tying Johan Cruyff's record for the fastest goal in the Netherlands. During his time at Cambuur, he also played as a winger. On 14 February 2011, Ghoochannejhad scored a hat trick against FC Emmen.

Sint-Truiden
In June 2011, Ghoochannejhad transferred to Sint-Truiden, scoring his first goal in the Belgian Pro League against Club Brugge.

Standard Liège
On 31 August 2012, Sint-Truiden came to an agreement with Standard Liège. Ghoochannejhad joined Standard Liège in January 2013 after signing a three-and-a-half-year deal, while scoring 10 goals in 12 matches in the half-season he remained with Sint-Truiden. The following season, he represented Liège in the 2013–14 UEFA Europa League.

Charlton Athletic
On 30 January 2014, Ghoochannejhad joined Championship side Charlton Athletic on a two-and-a-half-year deal, becoming the second Iranian after Karim Bagheri to play for the Addicks. On 1 February, he made his first appearance for Charlton in a 2–1 defeat away to Wigan Athletic, where he played the full 90 minutes and hit the bar with a shot on goal in the first half. He made his FA Cup debut in a 2–1 fifth round win at Sheffield Wednesday on 24 February. He scored his first goal on 1 April in a 1–0 league win at Leeds United.

Al-Kuwait (loan)
On 6 August 2014, Ghoochannejhad joined Al-Kuwait on a season-long loan deal. On 15 August, he made his debut as a substitute against Qadsia SC in the Kuwait Super Cup. On 26 August, he scored his first goal in the 2014 AFC Cup against Persipura Jayapura. He scored his first league goal for the club on 30 August in a 1–1 draw against Al Jahra. On 12 September, he scored 4 goals in an 8–1 win over Al-Sahel. He then scored a hat trick in 14 minutes in another game for Al-Kuwait. Ghoochannejhad scored 11 goals in 10 league matches with the club.

Al-Wakrah (loan)
In February 2015, Ghoochannejhad signed a four-month loan deal with Qatar Stars League club Al-Wakrah. He scored his first goal on 27 February 2015 against Umm Salal. Al-Wakrah escaped relegation on the last day and Ghoochannejhad's loan deal expired at the end of the season.

Return to Charlton
In the summer of 2015, Ghoochannejhad announced he would be returning to Charlton Athletic for the 2015–16 season. He scored his first goal of the season in a 4–1 League Cup victory against League Two side Dagenham & Redbridge. He scored his first league goal of the season on 7 November 2015 in a 3–1 win against Sheffield Wednesday. He was released by the south London club on Thursday 19 May 2016 following the end of the 2015–16 season. In total, Ghoochannejhad made 42 appearances in all competitions, scoring five goals. He left the club after they got relegated.

Return to Heerenveen
On 22 June 2016, Ghoochannejhad returned to former club Heerenveen with a two-year contract, In his first friendly match with the club he scored twice and also earned an assist. He scored his first and second goal for Heerenveen on 10 September 2016 in a 3–1 victory against Twente. He scored also twice in January 2017 in a match against ADO Den Haag, it was his second brace of the season and lifted Heerenveen to fourth place in the league. On 22 January 2017, Ghoochannejhad scored a hat-trick in a 4–3 loss against PSV Eindhoven. In the process he became the first ever Iranian to score a hat-trick in a top flight European league and became the first player to score a hat-trick away to PSV since the 1970s. He finished his first season at Eredivisie with 19 goals and became the third highest goalscorer and Heerenveen's 2016-17 player of the year and took place in Eredivisie 2016-17 team of the year. Ghoochannejhad did not continue his good work in his second season in Heerenveen and finished the season with 7 goals and became Heerenveen's top scorer.

APOEL
Ghoochannejhad signed for Cypriot First Division club APOEL on 23 July 2018 on a two-year contract. He played there for half of a season and scored two goals as well.

Sydney FC (loan)
Ghoochannejhad signed for A-League club Sydney FC on loan for six months on 31 January 2019. He made his debut on 8 February against the Brisbane Roar and became the first Iranian international in the A-League. He scored his first goal for the club on 1 March against Adelaide United.

He later scored the winning penalty in the 2019 A-League Grand Final and became the first Iranian to win the title in the Australian A-League.

PEC Zwolle
Ghoochannejhad joined Eredivisie side PEC Zwolle in September 2019.
During his debut, after coming on to the pitch he did a poker against RKC Waalwijk and scored four goals for his team to earn the three points and he became the first Eredivisie player in history to score four goals after coming on as a substitute.
And also the first Iranian to score four goals in one of the top European leagues.

On 22 January 2021, Ghoochannejhad scored three goals after coming on as substitute to make it 3–1 against Willem II and became the first player in the history of the Eredivisie to achieve a hat-trick twice as a substitute. In summer 2021, at the end of his two-year contract, he was released by PEC Zwolle.

As of September 2022, he is retired.

International career

Ghoochannejhad represented the Netherlands from 2003 to 2007, having played for the Netherlands U19 national team. After being invited to the Iran national team by coach Carlos Queiroz, he made his senior national team debut on 16 October 2012 in Iran's 1–0 2014 FIFA World Cup qualifier victory against South Korea, while scoring his first two goals in his third international cap against Lebanon in a 5–0 Asian Cup qualifier win. On 4 June 2013, Ghoochannejhad scored the lone goal in a World Cup qualifier against Qatar. Days later, he scored against Lebanon in a 4–0 win. He scored the winning goal again in the next match, a 1–0 win against South Korea. This led to Iran's qualification at the top of their group for the 2014 FIFA World Cup.

His goal-scoring streak continued, scoring in each of the Asian Cup qualifying matches against Thailand and Lebanon to secure Iran's spot in the 2015 AFC Asian Cup as well as becoming the top scorer of the qualifiers and bringing his tally to six goals in six consecutive competitive international matches. Ghoochannejhad scored on 5 March 2014 against Guinea in a friendly to bring his record to seven goals in seven matches with a total of nine goals in eleven matches.

On 1 June 2014, Ghoochannejhad was called into Iran's 2014 FIFA World Cup squad by Carlos Queiroz. On 25 June 2014, he scored Iran's only goal of the tournament in the 3–1 defeat against Bosnia and Herzegovina. He became the first ever Charlton Athletic player to score at a FIFA World Cup.

On 30 December 2014, Ghoochannejhad was called into Iran's 2015 AFC Asian Cup squad. He scored the only goal in the team's final group stage match against the United Arab Emirates, ensuring Team Melli qualified from Group C in first place. In the quarter-final match against Iraq, Ghoochannejhad scored Iran's third equalizer in the 119th minute as they drew 3–3 at Canberra Stadium and were eventually defeated 7–6 in a penalty shootout.

On 1 September 2016, Ghoochannejhad scored a stoppage time winner in a 2–0 victory against Qatar in the final round of Asian World Cup Qualifying.

On 10 November 2016, Ghoochannejhad scored his first Hat-trick in a 8-1 victory against Papua New Guinea in a friendly match.

In May 2018 he was named in Iran's preliminary squad for the 2018 FIFA World Cup in Russia, but not played any minutes in the tournament. On 27 June 2018, Ghoochannejhad announced his retirement from international football on his Instagram.

Style of play
Ghoochannejhad has been praised mostly for his sense of goal scoring and also his ability to find the right spot in attacking situations. He has been compared to Iranian legend Khodadad Azizi.

Outside football
Ghoochannejhad can speak at least four languages including English, Dutch, French and Persian as his mother tongue and he understands German too, he has said that he has also learned Italian and Portuguese. He is keen on playing musical instruments and he can play violin.

Personal life
Ghoochannejhad is the son of Jalal and Mahin Ghoochannejhad. His uncle, Jabar Ghoochannejhad, is a volleyball coach in Iranian Volleyball Super League.
Ghoochannejhad married Sarvin Bayat, sister of Iranian actress Sareh Bayat on 30 March 2016 in a private ceremony held in Imam Reza mosque. The couple have a son named Doran (born 29 January 2018).

He said that he has been a long time supporter of his home town football club, Aboomoslem, in his interview.

Career statistics

Club

International

Scores and results list Iran's goal tally first, score column indicates score after each Ghoochannejhad goal.

Honours
SC Heerenveen
KNVB Cup: 2008–09
APOEL FC
Cypriot First Division: 2018–19

Sydney FC
 A-League: 2018–19

Individual
 Eredivisie Team of the Season: 2016–17
 Heerenveen Player of the Year: 2016–17
 Scoring Eredivisie fastest goal in the 9th seconds tying Johan Cruyff's record.
 First Iranian to score a Hat-trick in Europe.
 First Iranian to score four goals in a single match in Europe.

See also
Iranians in the Netherlands

References

External links

 
 Reza Ghoochannejhad at Voetbal International 
 

1987 births
Living people
People from Mashhad
Sportspeople from Mashhad
Iranian footballers
Iran international footballers
Dutch footballers
Netherlands youth international footballers
Association football forwards
Iranian emigrants to the Netherlands
Iranian expatriate footballers
Expatriate footballers in the Netherlands
Expatriate footballers in Belgium
Expatriate footballers in England
Expatriate footballers in Kuwait
Expatriate footballers in Qatar
Expatriate footballers in Cyprus
Expatriate soccer players in Australia
Iranian expatriate sportspeople in the Netherlands
Iranian expatriate sportspeople in Belgium
Iranian expatriate sportspeople in England
Iranian expatriate sportspeople in Qatar
Eredivisie players
Eerste Divisie players
Belgian Pro League players
Challenger Pro League players
English Football League players
Kuwait Premier League players
Qatar Stars League players
Cypriot First Division players
A-League Men players
Go Ahead Eagles players
SC Heerenveen players
FC Emmen players
SC Cambuur players
Sint-Truidense V.V. players
Standard Liège players
Charlton Athletic F.C. players
Kuwait SC players
Al-Wakrah SC players
APOEL FC players
Sydney FC players
PEC Zwolle players
2014 FIFA World Cup players
2015 AFC Asian Cup players
Vrije Universiteit Amsterdam alumni
2018 FIFA World Cup players
Sportspeople of Iranian descent
Iranian expatriate sportspeople in Australia
Iranian expatriate sportspeople in Kuwait
People from Quchan